Aalborg Stadium (Danish: Aalborg Stadion; currently known as Aalborg Portland Park for sponsorship reasons) is a football stadium located in Aalborg, Denmark. It is the home ground of AaB. It has a capacity of 14,135 of which 8,997 is seated. For international matches the capacity is 10,500.

The stadium consists of 4 stands:
Two long-side stands:
The Complea stand (4,981 seats)
The A. Enggaard stand (2,720 seats)
Two end stands:
The Spar Nord stand (4,000 standing places)
The 3F stand (1,296 seats and 1000 standing places)

National games 
Aalborg Portland Park has six times been used as home ground for the Danish national team, and is supposed to be the venue for the friendly match against Senegal on 27 May 2010. Further it has been venue of several youth and female national matches:

See also 
 Aalborg Boldspilklub
 List of football stadiums in Denmark

References

External links 
  Aalborg Stadion at Aalborg Municipality's website
  Energi Nord Arena at AaB's website
  Energi Nord Arena

Aalborg Boldspilklub
Football venues in Denmark
Buildings and structures in Aalborg
Sport in Aalborg
Sports venues completed in 1960
1960 establishments in Denmark
UEFA Women's Championship final stadiums